Germantown, Maryland is a community in Montgomery County, and the only "Germantown, Maryland" recognized by the U.S. Postal Service.

Germantown, Maryland may also refer to:

Germantown, Anne Arundel County, Maryland, unincorporated locale
Germantown, Baltimore County, Maryland, unincorporated locale
Germantown, Worcester County, Maryland, unincorporated locale

See also 
Germantown (disambiguation)